Olejníkov is a village and municipality in Sabinov District in the Prešov Region of north-eastern Slovakia.

History
In historical records the village was first mentioned in 1454.

Geography
The municipality lies at an altitude of 484 metres and covers an area of 44.461 km². It has a population of about 357 people.

External links
 Official site
http://www.statistics.sk/mosmis/eng/run.html

Villages and municipalities in Sabinov District